Gabrielle Brune (12 February 1912 in Bournemouth, Hampshire – 18 January 2005 in Chichester, Sussex) was a British actress.

Career
On stage from 1930, her work included appearances in cabaret, the West End, on Broadway, in films and on television.

Personal life
Gabrielle Brune was born Gabrielle Hudson, the only child of Thomas Habgood Hudson and Adrienne Brune; both parents were theatre professionals from Australia. Her mother was an actress and singer. She used her mother's surname professionally.

In 1941, she was reported as recovering from appendicitis and double pneumonia in a river house at Datchet on the Thames.

Marriages
In 1938, Brune was described as "Mrs. G. M. Thompson, wife of an English actor" in a news report about her first professional trip to America: (NB: Raymond Francis). In 1942, she married an American Army officer, Maj. Walter J. Currie, in London.

She died in 2005, aged 92 years.

Selected filmography
 Red Pearls (1930)
 The Penny Pool (1937)
 The Wife of General Ling (1937)
 He Found a Star (1941)
 Tomorrow We Live (1943)
 A Run for Your Money (1949)
 Mandy (1952)
 Hot Ice (1952)
 The Wedding of Lilli Marlene (1953)
 The Titfield Thunderbolt (1953)
 Three Steps to the Gallows (1953)
 The Harassed Hero (1954)
 Touch and Go (1955)
 Fun at St. Fanny's (1956)
 Girl in the Headlines (1963)

References

External links

1912 births
2005 deaths
Actors from Bournemouth
English stage actresses
English film actresses
English television actresses